Donald Sidney Appleyard (July 26, 1928 – September 23, 1982) was an English-American urban designer and theorist, teaching at the University of California, Berkeley.

Born in England, Appleyard studied first architecture, and later urban planning at the Massachusetts Institute of Technology. After graduation, he taught at MIT for six years, 
and later at the University of California, Berkeley. He worked on neighbourhood design in Berkeley and Athens and citywide planning in San Francisco and Ciudad Guayana. Appleyard gave lectures at over forty universities and acted in a professional capacity in architecture and planning firms in the United Kingdom, Italy and the United States. He died in Athens as a consequence of a traffic collision.

His 1981 book Livable Streets was described at the time by Grady Clay, the editor of the Landscape Architecture magazine, as "the most thorough and detailed work on urban streets to date". It contained a comparison of three streets of similar morphology in San Francisco, which had different levels of car traffic: one with 2,000 vehicles per day, the others with 8,000 respectively 16,000 vehicles per day. His empirical research demonstrated that residents of the street with low car traffic volume had three times more friends than those living on the street with high car traffic.

Appleyard is co-author with Allan Jacobs of the paper "Toward an Urban Design Manifesto".

In 2009, he was named number 57 of Planetizen's Top 100 Thinkers of all time.

Publications
 The View from the Road, Cambridge, MA: MIT Press, 1964.
 Planning a Pluralistic City, Cambridge, MA: MIT Press, 1967.
 The Conservation of European Cities, Cambridge, MA: MIT Press, 1979.
 Livable Streets, University of California Press, Berkeley, 1981
 Toward an Urban Design Manifesto, Allan Jacobs and Donald Appleyard.  Working Paper published 1982; republished with a prologue in the Journal of the American Planning Association, 1987.

References

Further reading
 The Writings of Donald Appleyard, in Places, Vol I, Nr.3

External links
Diagram of social interaction relative to car traffic from Livable streets, 1981
Exposure of Appleyards findings
Finding Aid to the Donald Appleyard Papers, 1954-1982, bulk 1966-1982, The Bancroft Library

Urban theorists
MIT School of Architecture and Planning alumni
1928 births
1982 deaths
Urban designers
UC Berkeley College of Environmental Design faculty
Massachusetts Institute of Technology faculty
Academics from London
Road incident deaths in Greece
Sustainable transport pioneers